UFC Fight Night: Moicano vs. The Korean Zombie (also known as UFC Fight Night 154 or UFC on ESPN+ 12) was a mixed martial arts event produced by the Ultimate Fighting Championship held on June 22, 2019, at Bon Secours Wellness Arena in Greenville, South Carolina.

Background
The event marked the promotion's first visit to South Carolina.

A featherweight bout between Renato Moicano and former UFC Featherweight Championship challenger Chan Sung Jung served as the event headliner.

A middleweight bout between Markus Perez and Deron Winn was scheduled for the event. However, on May 9, it was reported that Perez had pulled out of the fight due to injury and was replaced by promotional newcomer Bruno Silva. On June 16, it was reported that Silva was forced out of the bout due to a potential anti-doping violation by USADA and was replaced by returning veteran Eric Spicely.

A bantamweight bout between Cody Stamann and Rob Font was scheduled to take place at the event. However, Stamann pulled out due to an injury and was replaced by John Lineker. The pairing met previously at UFC 198 in May 2016, with Lineker winning the fight via unanimous decision. In turn, Lineker pulled out due to a cut over his eyebrow on weigh in day. As a result, Font did not compete at the event and will be rescheduled for a future event.

Results

Bonus awards
The following fighters received $50,000 bonuses.
Fight of the Night: Deron Winn vs. Eric Spicely 
Performance of the Night: Chan Sung Jung and Jairzinho Rozenstruik

See also

 List of UFC events
 2019 in UFC
 List of current UFC fighters

References

UFC Fight Night
2019 in mixed martial arts
Mixed martial arts in South Carolina
Sports in Greenville, South Carolina
2019 in sports in South Carolina
June 2019 sports events in the United States